Paul Adelburt Bigsby (1899–1968) was an American inventor, designer, and pioneer of the solid body electric guitar. Bigsby is best known for having been the designer of the Bigsby vibrato tailpiece (also mislabeled as a tremolo arm) and proprietor of Bigsby Electric Guitars. 

He built an early steel guitar for Southern California steel guitarist Earl "Joaquin" Murphy of Spade Cooley's band, as well as Jack Rivers, then built a solid body electric guitar conceptualized by Merle Travis to have the same level of sustain as a steel guitar by anchoring the strings in the body instead of on a tailpiece. This instrument, which Bigsby completed in 1948, likely had an influence on the solid body Telecaster later produced by Leo Fender, as it had all six tuners in a row. Its headstock shape was later made famous by Fender's solid body Stratocaster model. Bigsby also made a doubleneck model for Nashville guitarist Grady Martin and an amplified mandolin for Texas Playboy Tiny Moore. Bigsby also built a pedal steel guitar for Speedy West that West used on many of Tennessee Ernie Ford's early recordings as well as records by Travis, Red Ingle, Jean Shepard, Johnny Horton, Ferlin Husky and Merrill Moore.

Before working in music he was a motorcycle racer known as "P.A. Bigsby", and was the foreman of Crocker Motorcycles, and designed many components, such as the overhead-valve cylinder head for their first V-twin motorcycle.  The vibrato tailpiece unit, however, was what made Bigsby's reputation, as it was used by Gibson, Gretsch and other guitar companies. In 1966, Bigsby sold the company to former Gibson guitar executive Ted McCarty. On May 10, 1999, the Fred Gretsch company purchased the Bigsby company.

References

1899 births
1968 deaths
American luthiers
20th-century American engineers